The 2018–19 Hoofdklasse was the 46th season of the Hoofdklasse, the Netherlands' highest field hockey league. It began on 26 August 2019 and it will conclude with the third match of the championship final on 26 May 2019.

Kampong were the defending champions, having won the 2017–18 season by defeating Amsterdam in the championship final. Bloemendaal won their 20th title by defeating Kampong 2–1 over three matches in the championship final.

Teams

A total of 12 teams took part in the league: The best nine teams from the 2017–18 season, the two promotion/relegation play-off winners (Pinoké and Almere) and the 2017–18 Overgangsklasse winners (Klein Zwitserland), who replaced HDM.

Number of teams by province

Regular season

League table

Results

Play-offs
All rounds are played in a best of three format, with the higher seeded team playing the second and third game at home.

Bracket

Semi-finals
The semi-finals were played from 15 to 19 May 2019.

(1) Bloemendaal vs (4) Amsterdam

Bloemendaal won series 2–0.

(2) Kampong vs. (3) HGC

Kampong won series 2–0.

EHL play-off
Because the regular season champions, Bloemendaal, also qualified for the final, an extra series was needed to determine the third Dutch qualifier for the 2019–20 Euro Hockey League.

HGC won series 2–1.

Final

Bloemendaal won series 2–1.

Relegation play-offs

|}

Statistics

Top goalscorers

References

External links
Flashscore page

Men's Hoofdklasse Hockey
Netherlands
Hoofdklasse Hockey Men
Hoofdklasse Hockey Men